Tennessee Woman is the eighteenth studio album by American country music singer Tanya Tucker, released on April 17, 1990. Three singles from Tennessee Woman made the Billboard Top Ten Country singles charts: "Walking Shoes" at #3, and "It Won't Be Me" and the duet with T. Graham Brown, "Don't Go Out" both at #6. Rounding out the hits was the #12 "Oh What It Did to Me." The album charted in at #18 in the Country Albums category.

"Take Another Run" was later a single for co-writer Paul Overstreet from his album Love Is Strong.

Track listing

Production
Produced By Jerry Crutchfield
Engineer: Jim Cotton

Personnel
Tanya Tucker - lead vocals
Eddie Bayers, Paul Leim, Harry Stinson - drums, percussion
Bob Wray - bass guitar
Roy Huskey Jr. - upright bass
Mitch Humphries, Matt Rollings - keyboards
Dennis Burnside - piano
Mike Lawler - synthesizer
Mark Casstevens, Steve Gibson, Don Potter, Brent Rowan, Reggie Young - guitar
Paul Franklin, Sonny Garrish - steel guitar
Terry McMillan - harmonica
Beth Nielsen Chapman, Louis Dean Nunley, Wayland Patton, Dennis Wilson, Curtis Young, Liana Young - backing vocals

Charts

Weekly charts

Year-end charts

References

Tanya Tucker: "Tennessee Woman" CD Liner Notes.  1990 Liberty/Capitol Records.

1990 albums
Liberty Records albums
Capitol Records albums
Tanya Tucker albums
Albums produced by Jerry Crutchfield